Galata is a district of Istanbul, Turkey.

Galata may also refer to:

Also in Turkey
 Galata Tower
Galata Bridge, the first bascule bridge in the world

In Greece
Galatas, Aetolia-Acarnania, a village in the municipality Nafpaktia, Aetolia-Acarnania 
Galatas, Chania, a village in the municipality Chania, Crete
Galatas, Corinthia, a village in Corinthia 
Galatas, Heraklion, a village in the municipality Minoa Pediada, Heraklion regional unit
Galatas Palace, a Minoan archaeological site
Galatas, Preveza, a village in the municipality Ziros, Preveza regional unit
Galatas, Troizina, a town in the northeastern part of the Peloponnese

In Romania
Galata, Iași, a neighbourhood of Iași, Romania
Galata Monastery

In Bulgaria
Galata, Lovech Province, a village in Lovech Province, Bulgaria
Galata, Varna, a neighbourhood of Varna, Bulgaria
Galata (headland), a rocky headland of the Black Sea at Varna, Bulgaria

In the USA
Galata, Montana, a prairie town in north central Montana

In Cyprus
Galata, Cyprus, a village in the Troodos mountains

Other uses
 Galata (horse)
 Galata (film), a 2014 Indian Telugu romantic comedy film

See also
Galatea (disambiguation)
Galatia (disambiguation)